The 2018 Open du Pays d'Aix was a professional tennis tournament played on clay courts. It was the fifth edition of the tournament which was part of the 2018 ATP Challenger Tour. It took place in Aix-en-Provence, France between 7 and 13 May 2018.

Singles main-draw entrants

Seeds

 1 Rankings as of 30 April 2018.

Other entrants
The following players received wildcards into the singles main draw:
  Elliot Benchetrit
  Geoffrey Blancaneaux
  Alexandre Müller
  Johan Tatlot

The following player received entry into the singles main draw as a special exempt:
  Nino Serdarušić

The following players received entry from the qualifying draw:
  Steven Diez
  Máximo González
  Gianluca Mager
  Alexei Popyrin

Champions

Singles

 John Millman def.  Bernard Tomic 6–1, 6–2.

Doubles

 Philipp Petzschner /  Tim Pütz def.  Guido Andreozzi /  Kenny de Schepper 6–7(3–7), 6–2, [10–8].

External links
Official Website

2018 ATP Challenger Tour
2018
2018 in French sport